Centaurea calcitrapa is a species of flowering plant known by several common names, including red star-thistle and purple star thistle. It is native to Europe but is rarely found there, it is known across the globe as an introduced species and often a noxious weed.  The species name calcitrapa comes from the word caltrop, a type of weapon covered in sharp spikes.

Description
This an annual or biennial plant growing erect to a maximum height of one to 1.3 metres.

The stems are hairless and grooved.

It sometimes takes the shape of a mound, and it is finely to densely hairy to spiny. The leaves are dotted with resin glands. The lowermost may reach a length of 20 centimeters and are deeply cut into lobes. The inflorescence contains a few flower heads. Each is 1.5 to 2 centimeters long and oval in general shape. The phyllaries are green or straw-colored and tipped in tough, sharp yellow spines. The head contains many bright purple flowers. The fruit is an achene a few millimeters long which lacks a pappus.

It flowers from July until September, and the seeds ripen from August to October.

The Red Star-thistle has been identified as a Priority Species by the UK Biodiversity Action Plan. It is identified as 'vulnerable' by the UNIC and is listed as Nationally Rare in the UK Red Data Book. There is no national or Sussex BAP for this species.

Distribution

Native distribution
Albania
Algeria
Austria
Baltic states
Bulgaria
Cape Verde
Cyprus
Czech Republic
Egypt
Sinai Peninsula
In France
Corsica
Greece
Crete
Dodecanese
North Aegean islands
Hungary
Iran
Italy
Sardinia
Sicily
Lebanon
Morocco
Portugal
Madeira
Romania
Saudi Arabia
Slovakia
Spain
Balearic Islands
Canary Islands
Sudan
Syria
Tunisia
Turkey
East Thrace
North Aegean islands
Ukraine
Crimea
former Yugoslavia

Introduced distribution
In Australia
South Australia
Tasmania
Victoria
Belgium
In Canada
Ontario
France
Germany
Great Britain
Western Himalaya
Ireland
Netherlands
Norway
Pakistan
Poland
In South Africa
Cape Provinces
Free State
Switzerland
Uruguay
In the United States:
Alabama
Arizona
California
Washington, D.C.
Florida
Georgia
Illinois
India
Iowa
Maryland
Massachusetts
New Jersey
New Mexico
New York State
Oregon
Pennsylvania
Utah
Virginia
Washington

Uses
In western Crete, Greece a local variety called gourounaki (γουρουνάκι - little pig) has its leaves eaten boiled by the locals. A south Italian variety of the species is also traditionally consumed by ethnic Albanians (Arbëreshë people) in the Vulture area (southern Italy). In the Arbëreshë communities in Lucania the young whorls of Centaurea calcitrapa are boiled and fried in mixtures with other weedy non cultivated greens.

Control

Herbicides
Picloram + 2,4-D, low volatile ester 2,4-D, Dicamba, and Fluroxypyr + Aminopyralid are recommended for use in New South Wales, and aminocyclopyrachlor + chlorsulfuron, aminopyralid, chlorsulfuron, clopyralid, clopyralid + 2,4-D, dicamba, diflufenzopyr + dicamba, picloram, and triclopyr + clopyralid for the Pacific Northwest of North America.

Herbicide resistance
Picloram + 2,4-D, low volatile ester 2,4-D, Dicamba, and Fluroxypyr + Aminopyralid all carry a "moderate" risk of producing resistance in C. calcitrapa.

Similar species
 Centaurea aspera, known as rough star-thistle. The main difference is the bract appendages are palmately arranged.
 Centaurea solstitialis, known as yellow star thistle. Differs in having yellow flowers palmately arranged, spiny bract appendages, with middle spine only 1 to 2 cm.

References

External links

USDA Plants Profile
California Invasive Plant Council
Photo gallery
Species Profile - Purple Star Thistle (Centaurea calcitrapa), National Invasive Species Information Center, United States National Agricultural Library. Lists general information and resources for Purple Star Thistle.

calcitrapa
Plants described in 1753
Taxa named by Carl Linnaeus
Flora of Malta